First-seeded John Sadri defeated Tim Wilkison 6–4, 3–6, 6–3, 6–4 to win the 1980 Benson and Hedges Open singles competition. Wilkison was the defending champion.

Seeds
A champion seed is indicated in bold text while text in italics indicates the round in which that seed was eliminated.

  John Sadri (champion)
  Tim Wilkison (final)
  Peter Feigl (semifinals)
  Kim Warwick (second round)
  Rod Frawley (semifinals)
  Paul McNamee (quarterfinals)
  Matt Mitchell (first round)
  Dale Collings (second round)

Draw

Key
 Q - Qualifier
 NB: The Final was the best of 5 sets while all other rounds were the best of 3 sets.

Final

Section 1

Section 2

External links
 Association of Tennis Professional (ATP) – 1980 Men's Singles draw

Singles
ATP Auckland Open